Sobrarbe is one of the comarcas of Aragon, Spain. It is located in the northern part of the province of Huesca, part of the autonomous community of Aragon in Spain. Many of its people speak the Aragonese language locally known as fabla.

The administrative capital is Boltaña and the economic development capital is Aínsa.

History
Sobrarbe was one of the Christian principalities of the Marca Hispanica, with obscure origins. Legend says there was a Kingdom of Sobrarbe, where a cross appeared upon a tree . 

It became part of the County of Aragon, but in the early 9th century was held for five years by Amrus ibn Yusuf, the governor of Zaragoza, being retaken after his death. Sobrarbe was joined to the County of Ribagorza in the early 10th century through the marriage of Bernard I of Ribagorza to Toda Galíndez of Aragon, daughter of Galindo Aznárez II. However, in the late 10th and early 11th century, a series of incursions from the south left it disorganized and depopulated, and for a time it again fell under Muslim control. This was reversed by Sancho the Great of Pamplona, who reconquered the region in 1015, similarly extending his power into Ribagorza over the subsequent years.  Whatever hereditary claim might have existed was subsequently brought to Sancho through his wife Muniadona of Castile, heiress to the Ribagorza counts.

Sancho divided the territories he had united, and his third son, Gonzalo, was given the counties of Sobrarbe and Ribagorza. After the death of Gonzalo in 1038, his illegitimate half-brother Ramiro I of Aragon brought Sobrarbe and Ribagorza into his hands, creating the nucleus of the Kingdom of Aragon.

Sobrarbe Geopark
The entire territory of Sobrarbe is "Sobrarbe Geopark" which is a member of the European Geoparks Network (2004-) and Global Geoparks Network (2006-) on account of its outstanding geological heritage, educational programs and projects, and promotion of geotourism.

Municipalities
Abizanda, Aínsa-Sobrarbe, Bárcabo, Bielsa, Boltaña, Broto, Fanlo, Fiscal, La Fueva, Gistaín, Labuerda, Laspuña, Palo, Plan, Puértolas, El Pueyo de Araguás, San Juan de Plan, Tella-Sin, Torla

See also
Solana Valley
Kingdom of Sobrarbe

References

External links
Sobrarbe official site
Turismo Sobrarbe. Portal Turístico de la Comarca de Sobrarbe
Sobrarbe Geopark (Geoparque de Sobrarbe)
Folklore

Comarcas of Aragon
Geography of the Province of Huesca
Pyrenees